Luhansk station is a junction railway station in Luhansk, Ukraine.

History
The history of the station began in 1878 with the opening ceremony of the Donetsk coal railway, which covered 389 miles, crossing open areas such as Mykytivka–Debaltseve–, Debaltseve, Popasna–Kramatorsk and Donetsk–Luhansk, which came to Luhansk from the Southwest.

The Donetsk Railway was managed from Luhansk until 1934, when the office moved to Donetsk.

Trains
Because of the Russo-Ukrainian War, all the long-distance trains ceased operating and only 2 restored trains, operated by the Luhansk People's Republic, continue to terminate at the station:
 Yasynuvata – Luhansk (via Donetsk)
 Luhansk – Manuilivka (3 times a day)

Photos

References

External links

 Train times on tutu.ru

Luhansk
Railway stations opened in 1878
Railway station